NeocoreGames is a Hungarian video game developer that focuses on creating and publishing role-playing video games. The company has their own development studio that is headquartered in Budapest, and the video games developed at NeocoreGames are created using their custom-built game engine named Coretech. The company is best known for their King Arthur: The Role-Playing Wargame series.

History

NeocoreGames was founded in 2005 and began working as a small game development studio. The studio is known for their work in the role-playing game genre exemplified by their King Arthur: The Role-Playing Wargame series. The sequel, King Arthur II: The Role-Playing Wargame, was developed using Coretech 2, NeocoreGames's new game engine.

In 2012 with the announcement of the action-RPG The Incredible Adventures of Van Helsing and the party-based tactical RPG Broken Sea, NeocoreGames has returned to independent video game development. In May 2012 the company announced the development of a role-playing game based on Bram Stoker's Dracula. Titled The Incredible Adventures of Van Helsing, the game follows Van Helsing's son as he travels to the eastern-European kingdom of Borgovia to slay the monsters that are overrunning the land. The game was to be the start of a new intellectual property for NeocoreGames. In June 2012 at the Electronic Entertainment Expo, NeocoreGames announced a second new game they were developing: Broken Sea is a fantasy tactical role-playing game developed for the PC. In August 2014, NeocoreGames announced their first tower defense game, titled Deathtrap. In February 2017, NeocoreGames launched the Founding for their upcoming Action-RPG titled Warhammer 40,000: Inquisitor – Martyr.

Games developed

References

External links

NeocoreGames Official website

Video game companies established in 2005
Video game development companies
Video game companies of Hungary
Companies based in Budapest
Hungarian companies established in 2005